Prunus buxifolia is a species of tree in the family Rosaceae. It is endemic to Colombia, where it is called chuwacá.

Distribution and habitat

References

buxifolia
Plants described in 1915
Flora of Colombia